In algebraic geometry, a Togliatti surface is a nodal surface of degree five with 31 nodes.

See also
Barth surface
Endrass surface
Sarti surface
List of algebraic surfaces

References
.
.

External links

Algebraic surfaces
Complex surfaces